Cameron Roberts (born 7 September 1978) is a former Australian rules footballer who played with Geelong in the Australian Football League (AFL).

A key position player, Roberts came to Geelong from North Adelaide. Roberts played three senior AFL games in 1997 and eight in the 1998 season. He returned to North Adelaide after leaving Geelong and in 2002 crossed to Sturt. He also spent some time in the Northern Territory, playing for Southern Districts.

References

1978 births
Australian rules footballers from South Australia
Geelong Football Club players
North Adelaide Football Club players
Sturt Football Club players
Southern Districts Football Club players
Living people
University Blacks Football Club players
Northern Territory Football Club players